Dr. Uriel S. Wright Office is a historic doctor's office located at Fayette, Howard County, Missouri.  It was built between 1828 and 1832, and is a small two-story, Federal style brick building. The building measures 19 feet square and features decorative window surrounds.

It was listed on the National Register of Historic Places in 1987.  It is located in the Fayette Courthouse Square Historic District.

References

Individually listed contributing properties to historic districts on the National Register in Missouri
Office buildings on the National Register of Historic Places in Missouri
Federal architecture in Missouri
Commercial buildings completed in 1832
Buildings and structures in Howard County, Missouri
National Register of Historic Places in Howard County, Missouri